International Federation of Air Traffic Safety Electronics Associations (IFATSEA) unites the professional associations of air traffic safety electronics personnel (ATSEPs) from around the world.

Aims and objectives
The aims of the Federation, as defined in the constitution, are as follows:
To operate as a non-political Federation of Air Traffic Safety Electronics Associations;
To promote safety and efficiency in the international air navigation system.
To assist and advise in the development of electronics systems in order to maintain the safe, orderly and expeditious flow of air traffic;
To uphold a high standard of knowledge and professional efficiency among Air Traffic Safety Electronics Personnel;
To protect and safeguard the collective professional interests of Air Traffic Safety Electronics Personnel;
To consider mutually beneficial affiliations with other professional organisations.
To strive for a worldwide Federation of Air Traffic Safety Electronics Associations.

How these aims may be achieved
The aims and problems related to electronics for air safety are generally similar throughout the world. These aims and the solutions of the related problems can best be achieved by international cooperation,
mutual understanding and exchange of ideas, informæion and experience.
It is fitting, therefore, that, Air Traffic Safety Electronics personnel at all levels and of all nations
should unite in a worldwide professional Federation which is based upon the principle of cooperation
in all professional matters.
Further, it must be emphasised that the Federation is independent of profit making or political
motives, essential requirements for international co-operation.

Services and activities

In order that IFATSEA aims are achieved, the Federation closely co-operates with national and international organisations, authorities and institutions. They do this by closely cooperating with national and international aviation authorities, and as such are represented in a large number of bodies that are looking at the present and future developments in air traffic control.

Inauguration
Following a series of person to person contacts over a number of years a meeting was convened in Brussels on 12 and 13 November 1971.

Attending the inaugural meeting were representatives from Austria, Belgium, France, Germany, United Kingdom, Ireland, Switzerland.

The meeting agreed that a draft Constitution would be presented to an inaugural Assembly to be held in Frankfurt in October 1972.

Ten countries were represented at the first Assembly.
These were: Austria, Belgium, Denmark, France, Germany, Greece, Ireland, Israel, Switzerland and United Kingdom

The  Assembly adopted the Constitution and the Federation had come into being with a membership of ten and a course of action was set in motion to make IFATSEA known, and to have as its primary object the recognition of Air Traffic Safety  Electronics Personnel, by  national and international bodies. It  was decided that the achievement of these aims  would best be served, by producing a journal and seeking the amendment of ICAO Annex 1.

Ten years after the setting up of IFATSEA, the membership had doubled and the federation was fully recognised as representing the interests of Air Traffic Safety Electronics Personnel by such bodies as, ICAO, International Labour Organization and EUROCAE. The association works closely with other Professional Associations for staff in the aviation sector, International Transport Workers Federation (ITF), IFATCA and IFALPA.

Executive board
The executive board consists of the posts of president, executive secretary, treasurer and the three vice-presidents each of whom serve a term of office of four years. Elections take place every two years with half of the posts being elected. At the 22nd Assembly on Cyprus, it was decided to cancel the titles 1st, 2nd and 3rd in connection with vice presidents, and only keep the titles vice presidents.

Standing committees
Individual Standing Committees were set up in 1981, based upon the main working subjects. These committees had the following names:

Recruitment and Training
Technical and Professional
Public Relation and Publication
Human and Environmental.

A general change of names for the Standing Committees was decided at the Assembly 1986, for better recognition of the working areas.

Membership
The membership includes 60 countries worldwide.
The Association also offers Corporate membership.

External links
 IFATSEA Website
  Air Traffic Systems Specialist Branch (UK Affiliate) Website Prospect
 Switzerland Affiliate SATTA
 Professional Aviations Safety Specialists (PASS), USA
 Associação Portuguesa dos Técnicos de Telecomunicações Aeronauticas, Portugal
 ATSEP Belgium
 Gewerkschaft der Flugsicherung (GdF, Germany)
 2009 Assembly Toulouse
 Turkish Air Traffic Safety Electronics Personnel Association (TATSETPA, Turkey)

Aviation-related professional associations
Air traffic control
Engineering societies
Organisations based in Brussels